Jussier da Silva Viera Formiga (born April 14, 1985) is a Brazilian mixed martial artist who competes in the Flyweight division. A professional competitor since 2005, Formiga most notably competed in the UFC and is the former Shooto South America 123-pound champion.

Mixed martial arts career

Shooto Brazil
Formiga won his professional mixed martial arts debut fight on November 29, 2008 at Shooto: Brazil 9 against Michael Willian Costa via split decision.

This was followed up by an upset victory over Shinichi "BJ" Kojima via unanimous decision at Shooto: Revolutionary Exchanges 1: Undefeated.

It was expected Formiga would be brought back for a year-end title rematch with Kojima. However, Kojima vacated the Shooto Bantamweight Championship, further complicating Jussier's future with the organization.

Formiga was at this point, ranked as the number one Flyweight in the world and then fought Alexandre Pantoja, who was unbeaten as a Flyweight. On June 12, 2010, Formiga defeated Pantoja by unanimous decision to defend his South America Shooto 123 lb Championship.

Tachi Palace Fights
Formiga signed a four-fight exclusive contract with the California-based Tachi Palace Fights organization. His first fight with the organization was against WEC veteran Danny Martinez at Tachi Palace Fights 7. Formiga won the fight by unanimous decision.

Fomiga's next fight was against another WEC veteran in Ian McCall. He lost the fight via unanimous decision.

Formiga next faced top-ranked Flyweight Mamoru Yamaguchi at Tachi Palace Fights 10. He won the fight via unanimous decision.

Ultimate Fighting Championship
On July 14, 2012 it was announced that Formiga signed with the UFC.

Formiga faced John Dodson on October 5, 2012 at UFC on FX 5. After a slow first round, Formiga began to succumb to the speed of Dodson, and was eventually finished via TKO with ground strikes at 4:35 of the second round.

Formiga faced Chris Cariaso on May 18, 2013 at UFC on FX 8. He won the fight via unanimous decision.

Formiga faced Joseph Benavidez on September 4, 2013 at UFC Fight Night 28. He lost the fight via TKO in the first round.

Formiga faced Scott Jorgensen on March 23, 2014 at UFC Fight Night 38. Formiga won the fight via submission in the first round.  Formiga unintentionally butted Jorgensen's chin with the top of his skull, which went unnoticed by the referee and submitted the dazed Jorgensen via rear-naked choke. Jorgensen appealed the headbutt to the Brazilian Athletic Commission, however the result was upheld.

Formiga was expected to face Zach Makovsky on August 2, 2014 at UFC 176.  However, after UFC 176 was cancelled, Formiga/Makovsky was rescheduled and eventually took place on August 16, 2014 at UFC Fight Night 47. Formiga won the fight via unanimous decision.

Formiga was expected to face John Moraga on December 13, 2014 at UFC on Fox 13. However, on November 21, Formiga pulled out of the fight and was replaced by UFC newcomer Willie Gates.

Formiga faced Wilson Reis on May 30, 2015 at UFC Fight Night 67. He won the back-and-forth fight by unanimous decision.

Formiga next faced Henry Cejudo on November 21, 2015 at The Ultimate Fighter Latin America 2 Finale. He lost the fight by split decision.

Formiga faced Dustin Ortiz on September 24, 2016 at UFC Fight Night 95. He won the fight via unanimous decision.

Formiga was expected to face Sergio Pettis on January 15, 2017 at UFC Fight Night 103. However, Formiga pulled out of the fight in late December and was replaced by John Moraga.

Formiga faced Ray Borg on March 11, 2017 at UFC Fight Night 106. He lost the fight via unanimous decision.

After alternating between wins and losses in the latest four fights, Formiga decided to move from his native Brazil to Florida, United States in order to train at American Top Team.

Formiga faced Ulka Sasaki on September 23, 2017 at UFC Fight Night: Saint Preux vs. Okami. He won the fight via submission in the first round.

Formiga faced Ben Nguyen on February 11, 2018 at UFC 221. He won the fight via technical submission in the third round due to a rear-naked choke. This win earned him the Performance of the Night bonus.

Formiga faced Sergio Pettis on October 6, 2018 at UFC 229. He won the fight via unanimous decision.

Formiga faced Deiveson Figueiredo on March 23, 2019 at UFC Fight Night 148. He won the fight via unanimous decision.

Formiga faced Joseph Benavidez in a rematch on June 29, 2019 at UFC on ESPN 3. He lost the fight via technical knockout in the second round.

Formiga faced Brandon Moreno on March 14, 2020 at UFC Fight Night 170. He lost the fight via unanimous decision.

Formiga faced Alex Perez on June 6, 2020 at UFC 250. He lost the bout via first round technical knockout.

On November 16, 2020, it was announced that Formiga had been released from his UFC contract and is now a free agent.

Post-UFC career
After the release from the UFC, Formiga headlined LFA 124 against Felipe Bunes on February 11, 2022. He won the fight via technical submission due to a rear-naked choke in the second round.

Championships and awards
Shooto South America
Shooto South American 123 lb Championship
Ultimate Fighting Championship
Performance of the Night (One time)  vs  Ben Nguyen

Mixed martial arts record

|-
|Win
|align=center|24–8
|Felipe Bunes
|Technical Submission (rear-naked choke)
|LFA 124
|
|align=center|2
|align=center|1:53
|Phoenix, Arizona, United States
|
|-
|Loss
|align=center|23–8
|Alex Perez
|TKO (leg kicks)
|UFC 250
|
|align=center|1
|align=center|4:06
|Las Vegas, Nevada, United States
|
|-
|Loss
|align=center|23–7
|Brandon Moreno
|Decision (unanimous)
|UFC Fight Night: Lee vs. Oliveira 
|
|align=center|3
|align=center|5:00
|Brasília, Brazil
| 
|-
|Loss
|align=center|23–6
|Joseph Benavidez
|TKO  (head kick and punches)
|UFC on ESPN: Ngannou vs. dos Santos 
|
|align=center|2
|align=center|4:47
|Minneapolis, Minnesota, United States
|
|-
|Win
|align=center|23–5
|Deiveson Figueiredo
| Decision (unanimous)
|UFC Fight Night: Thompson vs. Pettis 
|
| align=center|3
| align=center|5:00
|Nashville, Tennessee, United States
|
|- 
|Win
|align=center|22–5
|Sergio Pettis
| Decision (unanimous)
|UFC 229 
|
| align=center|3
| align=center|5:00
|Las Vegas, Nevada, United States
|
|-
|Win
|align=center|21–5
|Ben Nguyen
|Technical Submission (rear-naked choke)
|UFC 221 
|
|align=center|3
|align=center|1:43
|Perth, Australia
|
|-
|Win
|align=center|20–5
|Ulka Sasaki
|Submission (rear-naked choke)
|UFC Fight Night: Saint Preux vs. Okami 
|
|align=center|1
|align=center|4:30
|Saitama, Japan
|
|-
|Loss
| align=center| 19–5
| Ray Borg
| Decision (unanimous)
| UFC Fight Night: Belfort vs. Gastelum
| 
| align=center|3
| align=center|5:00
| Fortaleza, Brazil
|
|-
| Win
| align=center| 19–4
| Dustin Ortiz
| Decision (unanimous)
| UFC Fight Night: Cyborg vs. Lansberg
| 
| align=center| 3
| align=center| 5:00
| Brasília, Brazil
|  
|-
| Loss
| align=center| 18–4
| Henry Cejudo
| Decision (split)
| The Ultimate Fighter Latin America 2 Finale: Magny vs. Gastelum
| 
| align=center|3
| align=center|5:00
| Monterrey, Mexico
|  
|-
| Win
| align=center| 18–3
| Wilson Reis
| Decision (unanimous)
| UFC Fight Night: Condit vs. Alves
| 
| align=center| 3
| align=center| 5:00
| Goiânia, Brazil
| 
|-
| Win
| align=center| 17–3
| Zach Makovsky
| Decision (unanimous)
| UFC Fight Night: Bader vs. Saint Preux
| 
| align=center| 3
| align=center| 5:00
| Bangor, Maine, United States
| 
|-
| Win
| align=center| 16–3
| Scott Jorgensen
| Submission (rear-naked choke)
| UFC Fight Night: Shogun vs. Henderson 2
| 
| align=center| 1
| align=center| 3:07
| Natal, Brazil
| 
|-
| Loss
| align=center| 15–3
| Joseph Benavidez
| TKO (knee to the body and punches)
| UFC Fight Night: Teixeira vs. Bader
| 
| align=center| 1
| align=center| 3:07
| Belo Horizonte, Brazil
| 
|-
| Win
| align=center| 15–2
| Chris Cariaso
| Decision (unanimous)
| UFC on FX: Belfort vs. Rockhold
| 
| align=center| 3
| align=center| 5:00
| Jaraguá do Sul, Brazil
| 
|-
| Loss
| align=center| 14–2
| John Dodson
| TKO (punches)
| UFC on FX: Browne vs. Bigfoot
| 
| align=center| 2
| align=center| 4:35
| Minneapolis, Minnesota, United States
| 
|-
| Win
| align=center| 14–1
| Sidney Oliveira
| Submission (rear-naked choke)
| Shooto Brazil 31
| 
| align=center| 1
| align=center| 2:45
| Brasília, Brazil
| 
|-
| Win
| align=center| 13–1
| Martin Coria
| Submission (triangle choke)
|Coliseu Extreme Fight
| 
| align=center| 3
| align=center| 2:11
| Maceió, Brazil
| 
|-
| Win
| align=center| 12–1
| Rodrigo Santos
| Submission (rear-naked choke)
|Fort MMA Championships 1
| 
| align=center| 1
| align=center| 3:52
| Natal, Brazil
| 
|-
| Win
| align=center| 11–1
| Michael Willian
| Submission (rear-naked choke)
| Shooto Brazil 26
| 
| align=center| 2
| align=center| 4:55
| Rio de Janeiro, Brazil
| 
|-
| Win
| align=center| 10–1
| Mamoru Yamaguchi
| Decision (unanimous)
| Tachi Palace Fights 10
| 
| align=center| 3
| align=center| 5:00
| Lemoore, California, United States
| 
|-
| Loss
| align=center| 9–1
| Ian McCall
| Decision (unanimous)
| TPF 8: All or Nothing
| 
| align=center| 3
| align=center| 5:00
| Lemoore, California, United States
| 
|-
| Win
| align=center| 9–0
| Danny Martinez
| Decision (unanimous)
| Tachi Palace Fights 7
| 
| align=center| 3
| align=center| 5:00
| Lemoore, California, United States
| 
|-
| Win
| align=center| 8–0
| Alexandre Pantoja
| Decision (unanimous)
| Shooto Brazil 16
| 
| align=center| 3
| align=center| 5:00
| Rio de Janeiro, Brazil
| 
|-
| Win
| align=center| 7–0
| Shinichi Kojima
| Decision (unanimous)
| Shooto Revolutionary Exchanges 1: Undefeated
| 
| align=center| 3
| align=center| 5:00
| Tokyo, Japan
| 
|-
| Win
| align=center| 6–0
| Michael Willian
| Decision (split)
| Shooto Brazil 9
| 
| align=center| 3
| align=center| 5:00
| Fortaleza, Brazil
| 
|-
| Win
| align=center| 5–0
| Ralph Lauren
| Submission (rear-naked choke)
| Shooto Brazil 8
| 
| align=center| 1
| align=center| 1:46
| Rio de Janeiro, Brazil
| 
|-
| Win
| align=center| 4–0
| Jose Maria Tome
| Submission (rear-naked choke)
|Original Bairros Fight 7
| 
| align=center| 1
| align=center| 3:41
| Natal, Brazil
| 
|-
| Win
| align=center| 3–0
| Arinaldo Batista
| Decision (unanimous)
|Hikari Fight
| 
| align=center| 3
| align=center| 5:00
| Natal, Brazil
| 
|-
| Win
| align=center| 2–0
| Amaury Junior
| Decision (unanimous)
|Mossoró Fight
| 
| align=center| 3
| align=center| 5:00
| Mossoró, Brazil
| 
|-
| Win
| align=center| 1–0
| Chacal Chacal
| Submission (armbar)
|Tremons Fight
| 
| align=center| 1
| align=center| 3:20
| Natal, Brazil
| 
|-

See also
 List of male mixed martial artists

References

External links
 
 

Brazilian male mixed martial artists
Flyweight mixed martial artists
Mixed martial artists utilizing judo
Mixed martial artists utilizing Brazilian jiu-jitsu
Brazilian practitioners of Brazilian jiu-jitsu
People awarded a black belt in Brazilian jiu-jitsu
Brazilian male judoka
People from Natal, Rio Grande do Norte
Living people
1985 births
Ultimate Fighting Championship male fighters
Sportspeople from Rio Grande do Norte